The women's 100m freestyle events at the 2019 World Para Swimming Championships were held in the London Aquatics Centre at the Queen Elizabeth Olympic Park in London between 9–15 September.

Medalists

Results

S3

S4

S5

S6

S7

S8

S9

S10

S11

S12

S13

References

2019 World Para Swimming Championships
2019 in women's swimming